Hannah Marie Wormington (September 5, 1914 – May 31, 1994) was an American archaeologist known for her writings and fieldwork on southwestern and Paleo-Indians archaeology over a long career that lasted almost sixty years.

Background
Marie Wormington was born in Denver, Colorado, to Charles Watkin Wormington and Adrienne Roucolle. As a young child Wormington spent much of her time with her mother and her maternal grandmother who had come to the United States from France. Being fluent in both English and French proved to be a useful asset the summer she went to France to start her archaeology career. Wormington was the first woman to focus on anthropology at Radcliffe. While taking classes at Harvard for her Ph.D. she had a professor who requested that she (because she was a woman) sit outside the classroom to take notes.  Before obtaining her Ph.D., Wormington already had an accomplished career in anthropology, which began in 1935 after she graduated with her B.A. in Anthropology from the University of Denver. Her initial areas of interest were medicine and zoology, but changed to archaeology after taking a few classes taught by E. B. Renaud, whose focus was on the French Paleolithic. He supported the idea of Paleolithic stone tool technologies in the New World that were identical to other parts of the world. Renaud suggested to Wormington traveling to France to do research.

Education
Wormington earned a B.A. of Anthropology at University of Denver in 1935, a M.A. of Anthropology at Radcliffe College in 1950, and a Ph.D. of Anthropology at Radcliffe (Harvard University) in 1954.

Wormington jump-started her career through the connections she made by contacting Dorothy Garrod when she was in London. Garrod became a mentor to Wormington, and she put her in touch with some notable archaeologists working in Paris at the time, including Harper Pat Kelley and Henri Martin. While working alongside Kelley, Wormington was allowed to borrow artifacts found in Europe for data collection at the Denver Museum. Martin insisted that Wormington be a part of the Paleolithic excavations taking place at Dordogne, and Wormington spent her 21st birthday doing just that. After returning home to her native Denver, she was hired on at the Colorado Museum of Natural History (known today as the Denver Museum of Nature & Science) in the anthropology department until it closed in 1968, thus her appointment as a curator spanned 33 years. Because of her background as one of the foremost authorities on the subject of Paleo Indian studies, the museum was able to establish a formidable reputation. While working at the museum and before obtaining her MA and Ph.D. Wormington wrote Ancient Man in North America as well as Prehistoric Indians of the South West' '.Ancient Man in North America was the first comprehensive compilation of the Pleistocene and the early Holocene occupations found in North America. This book went through over a dozen revisions and was considered a classic in the field of Paleo Indian archaeology. The information within the book supplied a generation of archaeologists with an in-depth summary of research.Prehistoric Indians in the South West'' also went through several revisions and was used as a standard text during the late 1940s and early 1950s. Shortly after this publication, she developed an exhibit at the museum titled “Hall of Man”.
	
In 1940, Wormington married George D. Volk, a petroleum geologist and engineer, but she chose to keep her maiden name. During World War II, Wormington took a leave of absence from the museum to travel with Volk until he was sent overseas. At this point she returned to the museum. Volk died in 1980, after 40 years of marriage. During those years he supported Wormington’s career by building screens and repairing shovels to be used during  excavations as well as taking on dish duty at camp.

Employment
In 1936 Wormington started cataloging all of the artifacts from the Lindenmeier site in Colorado at the Colorado Museum of Natural History (which is known today as the Denver Museum of Nature & Science). The Lindenmeier site is one of the first Paleo Indian camps to be excavated. The tools found were often associated with extinct bison. Worminton was in charge of the comparison of these artifacts with those found in Europe. While working at the museum Wormington began her own research at the Montrose Rock Shelters and the Johnson site.  Along with her work in Colorado, she also participated in excavations at the Fremont village site in Utah. The research collected at the Fremont site supplied the evidence needed for Wormington to conclude in her report that the Fremont culture originated in the ancient Desert Culture of the Great Basin. Throughout her career at the Colorado Museum of Natural History Wormington assisted as well as acted as a consultant for many famous sites for Paleo Indian culture in the New World. During these years Hannah Marie Wormington became a close friend and later a mentor to several aspiring archaeologies such as Cynthia Irwin Williams and her brother Henry Irwin. Marie, as they knew her, always encouraged them to ask questions and pursue anthropology as a career.

Significant site excavations

 1935- Dordogne, France
 1936- Montrose Rock Shelter, Colorado
 1936- Johnson site (a minor Folsom camp), La Porte, Colorado
 1939 to 1948- Turner ranch, Utah (doctoral research)
 1953- Consultant for a mammoth excavation in the Valley of Mexico
 1955- Consultant for excavation of human remains near Turin Iowa
 1955 and 1956- prehistoric migration routes of ancient hunters in the Province of Alberta, Canada.
 1960-Frazier Agate Basin site; with Joe Ben Wheat at the Jurgens Cody site Weld County, Colorado.
 1963- Consultant for the excavations at Onion Portage, Alaska

After working at the museum until 1968, Wormington was a popular visiting professor and lecturer at a number of universities starting at Arizona State University where she taught from 1968 to 1969. From ASU, she returned to Colorado and taught at Colorado College (1969–1970). Following a three-year break, Worminton taught in 1973 at the University of Minnesota while acting as an adjunct professor at Colorado College, a position she held until 1986.

Achievements
In the same year she left the Denver museum (1968), Wormington was the first female archaeologist to be elected president of the Society for American Archaeology. She had previously held the title of vice president twice (1950–51, 1955–56). She was awarded a Guggenheim fellowship in 1970, and in 1977 she was awarded an honorary doctor of letters from Colorado state university. In 1983, the Society of American Archaeology awarded her the Distinguished Service Award, being the first female archaeologist to receive the award. Just two years later she was awarded the Colorado Archaeology Society C.T. Hurst award for her significant role in Colorado Archaeology.  She was inducted into the Colorado Women's Hall of Fame in 1985. In 1988 she was once again awarded honorary doctor of letters degree from Colorado College, the same year she was appointed the curator emeritus of the Denver Museum of Natural History.
Steve Cassels has written, "Just as Margaret Mead did in cultural anthropology, Marie has paved the way for women in archaeology, having persevered despite various degrees of discrimination throughout her career."

Death
Wormington died in her home in Denver on May 31, 1994 due to smoke inhalation after a fire that had started in the living room where she was sleeping. She had fallen asleep on the couch after lighting a cigarette; that cigarette then lit the couch on fire.

Selected books and papers
Wormington, H. M.

1939- Ancient Man in North America
1947- Prehistoric Indians of the Southwest
1955- A Reappraisal of the Freemont Culture, with a Summary of the Archaeology of the Northern Periphery. Denver Museum of Natural History, Proceedings No. 1
1977- Archeology of the Late and Post-Pliocene from a New World perspective. In Paleoanthropology in the People's Republic of China. W. W. Howells and Patricia Jones Tsuchitani, eds. Washington, DC: National Academy of Sciences.
1979- (Obituary) William Thomas Malloy, 1917–1978. American Antiquity 44(3)
1983 Early Man in the New World: 1970–1980. In Early Man in the New World. Richard Shutler, Jr., ed. Berkeley: Sage Publications.

Wormington H. M. and Betty Holmes
1937- The differentiation of Yuma Points 
1937-A comparison of Folsom and Yuma Flaking Techniques

Wormington, H.M. and Robert Lister
1956- Archaeological Investigations of the Uncomphgre Plateau. Denver Museum of Natural History, Proceedings No. 2

Wormington, H.M and Richard Forbis
1965- An Introduction to the Archaeology of Alberta, Canada, Denver Museum of Natural History Proceedings No. 11

Wormington, H. M. and D. Ellis (editors)
1967- Pleistocene Studies in Southern Nevada. Nevada State Museum, Anthropological Papers No. 13, Carson City
1948- A proposed Revision of the Yuma Point Terminology; Proceedings, Colorado Museum of Natural History, Vol. 18, No. 2
1962- A Survey of Early American Prehistory. American Scientist 50(1): 230-42.

References

External links

1914 births
1994 deaths
Arizona State University faculty
Colorado College faculty
Writers from Denver
Radcliffe College alumni
University of Denver alumni
University of Minnesota faculty
American women archaeologists
20th-century American archaeologists
20th-century American women
American women academics